Jo Kyung Ran (This is the author's preferred Romanization per LTI Korea) is a South Korean writer.

Life
Jo Kyung Ran was born in Seoul in 1969  where she went on to study creative writing at the Seoul Institute of the Arts, but did not decide to become a writer until she turned 28. Jo lived in Bonngcheon-dong for nearly 20 years in a small rooftop apartment which her father built for her. She made her literary debut in 1996 with the short story, French Optical which won the Donga-Ilbo Prize. 
Internationally famous, she is a speaker in demand for conferences, having appeared at “Beyond Borders: Translating and Publishing Korean Literature in the U.S.” in New York in 2009  and more recently at The Seoul International Forum for Literature 2011.

Work
Jo's work is famous for taking trivial, mundane, and everyday occurrences and delicately describing them in subtle emotional tones.

LTI Korea describes her contributions to Korean Literature:

Cho tends to dwell on the impressions (things) make, and with precision and sensitivity, describes their effect on the inner world of the protagonist. Often, she describes her characters minimally or presents them like objects lacking personality, thereby accentuating human alienation and difficulty of communication in the modern world. The author, nonetheless, suggests a possibility for meaningful human relationships by shedding light on those aspects of life that has not been corrupted by consumeristic or merely sexual interaction between people.

Her work has won the Munhakdongne New Writer Award, the Today's Young Artist Award, The Contemporary Literature Award (for the 2003 novella A Narrow Gate), and the Dong-in Literary Award(2008). Her work has been translated into French, German, Hebrew and English.

Works in Korean (Partial)
 French Optical (1997)
 Time for Breaking Bread (1997, 식빵 굽는 시간)
 My Purple Sofa (2000)
 Looking for the Elephant (2002, 코끼리를 찾아서)
 The Ladle Story (2004)
 Tongue (2007)
 I Bought a Balloon (2008)
 Swordfish
 Versammelte lichter (소설선)

Awards
 1st Literary Community New Writer's Award(1996)
 Dong-in Literary Award (2008 for Buying a Balloon)

External links
An interview with the author (in English and Korean) can be found at KTLIT: Video bilingual interview of Jo Kyung Ran (“Tongue”) by Krys Lee (“Drifting House”)

References 

1969 births
South Korean writers
Living people
International Writing Program alumni